In mathematics, the Pocklington–Lehmer primality test is a primality test devised by Henry Cabourn Pocklington and Derrick Henry Lehmer.

Pocklington criterion
The basic version of the test relies on the Pocklington theorem (or Pocklington criterion) which is formulated as follows:

Let  be an integer, and suppose there exist natural numbers  and  such that

Then  is prime.

Note: Equation is simply a Fermat primality test. (This divisibility condition is not explicitly stated because it is implied by equation.) For example, let . With , we find that . This is enough to prove that  is not prime.

Suppose  is not prime.  This means there must be a prime , where  that divides .

Thus there must exist an integer , a multiplicative inverse of  modulo , with the property that

and therefore, by Fermat's little theorem

This implies
 
   , by  since 
   ,
   , by 

Given , if  and  can be found which satisfy the conditions of the theorem, then  is prime.  Moreover, the pair constitute a primality certificate which can be quickly verified to satisfy the conditions of the theorem, confirming  as prime.

First, it is usually difficult to find a large prime factor of a large number. Second, for many primes , such a  does not exist.

Given , finding  is not nearly as difficult. This  will satisfy as long as ord() does not divide . Thus a randomly chosen  in the interval  has a good chance of working.

Generalized Pocklington test
The above version of version of Pocklington's theorem is sometimes impossible to apply because some primes  are such that there is no prime  dividing  where . The following generalized version of Pocklington's theorem is more widely applicable.

If for each prime factor  of  there exists an integer  so that

then N is prime.

Let  be a prime dividing  and let  be the maximum power of  dividing .
. This means
  and because of  also
.

Thus, .  The same observation holds for each prime power factor  of A,
which implies .

Specifically, this means 

It has been shown that there is no such factor, which proves that  is prime.

Comments
The Pocklington–Lehmer primality test follows directly from this corollary.

To use this corollary, first find enough factors of  so the product of those factors exceeds .
Call this product .
It does not matter whether  is prime.
If such s can be found, the Corollary implies that  is prime.

According to Koblitz,  = 2 often works.

Example

Determine whether
 
is prime.

We quickly find that
 .
We must determine whether  and  meet the conditions of the Corollary.
, so .
We must also verify that .

It does not matter whether  is prime (in fact, it is not).

For , try .
Raising  to this high power can be done efficiently using binary exponentiation:

 
 .

So,  satisfies but not.  As we are allowed a different  for each , try  instead:

 
 .

 .
 .

This completes the proof that  is prime.
The certificate of primality for  would consist of the two  pairs (2, 5) and (3, 2).

We have chosen small numbers for this example, but in practice when we start factoring  we may get factors that are themselves so large their primality is not obvious.

In our example, we can say with certainty that 2 and 3 are prime, and thus we have proved our result.  The primality certificate is the list of pairs, which can be quickly checked in the corollary.

If our example had included large prime factors, the certificate would be more complicated. This can continue for many layers if the initial prime is large, but the important point is that a certificate can be produced, containing at each level the prime to be tested, and the corresponding s, which can easily be verified.

Extensions and variants

The 1975 paper by Brillhart, Lehmer, and Selfridge gives a proof for what is shown above as the "generalized Pocklington theorem" as Theorem 4 on page 623.  Additional theorems are shown which allow less factoring.  This includes their Theorem 3 (a strengthening of an 1878 theorem of Proth):

 Let  where  is an odd prime such that .

Theorem 5 of the Brillhart, Lehmer, and Selfridge paper allows a primality proof when the factored part has reached only .

References 
 Leonard Eugene Dickson, "History of the Theory of Numbers" vol 1, p 370, Chelsea Publishing 1952
 Henry Pocklington, "Math. Quest. Educat. Times", (2), 25, 1914, p 43-46 (Mathematical questions and solutions in continuation of the mathematical columns of "the Educational times".)

External links 
Chris Caldwell, "Primality Proving 3.1: n-1 tests and the Pepin's tests for Fermats" at the Prime Pages.
Chris Caldwell, "Primality Proving 3.2: n+1 tests and the Lucas-Lehmer test for Mersennes" at the Prime Pages.

Primality tests